Eric Allen Axley (born April 22, 1974) is an American professional golfer.

Career
Axley was born in Athens, Tennessee. He turned professional in 1997. He is one of the few natural left-handers to win on the Web.com Tour and PGA Tour.

In 2006, Axley won the Valero Texas Open, claiming his first PGA Tour win. After a poor 2009 season, Axley lost his PGA Tour playing rights. Axley divided his time among the NGA Hooters Tour, eGolf Professional Tour, Web.com Tour, and PGA Tour.

In 2014, Axley tried to play his way back to the PGA Tour through Monday qualifying and past champion status. Axley made seven cuts in ten events and finished 184th in the FedEx Cup standings, good enough for a trip to the Web.com Tour Finals. Axley finished 50th, the last position to earn a PGA Tour card and his first in five years, by just $31.66. After barely gaining a PGA Tour card, he barely missed getting it back for the 2015-16 season, just $101 behind Rob Oppenheim.

Professional wins (5)

PGA Tour wins (1)

Web.com Tour wins (2)

*Note: The 2018 North Mississippi Classic was shortened to 54 holes due to weather.

Web.com Tour playoff record (0–1)

NGA Hooters Tour wins (2)
2002 Northwest Arkansas Classic
2003 Capitol City Open

Results in major championships

CUT = missed the half-way cut
"T" = tied

Results in The Players Championship

CUT = missed the half-way cut

See also
2005 Nationwide Tour graduates
2014 Web.com Tour Finals graduates

References

External links

American male golfers
East Tennessee State Buccaneers men's golfers
PGA Tour golfers
Korn Ferry Tour graduates
Golfers from Knoxville, Tennessee
Left-handed golfers
People from Athens, Tennessee
1974 births
Living people